Jalan Ahmad Ibrahim is a road located in Boon Lay, Singapore. Named after Singaporean politician Ahmad Ibrahim, the road links Ayer Rajah Expressway with Jurong Hill Flyover.

History
Built in 1961, it was the first road to be built as an expansion into Jurong, conceived at that time to be an industrial area. After the passing of Ahmad Ibrahim, the road was named after him in his honor after being completed in 1965. Jalan Ahmad Ibrahim first started from Jalan Bahru Selatan (Now Jurong Town Hall Road) to Jalan Bandaran/Jalan Besi (Now Pioneer Road/Pioneer Road North).

In 1998, Ayer Rajah Expressway was further expanded into Tuas. The extension followed the alignment of Jalan Ahmad Ibrahim. The road was widened, with all roundabouts replaced with flyovers, and interchanges and slip roads built along some parts of the expressway to serve the existing establishments along the road. Eventually, the slip roads also took on the name "Jalan Ahmad Ibrahim".

References

Roads in Singapore
Jurong West
Boon Lay